Eoin Coughlan (born 31 March 1992) is an Australian judoka. He competed at the 2016 Summer Olympics in the men's 81 kg event, in which he was eliminated in the second round by Lee Seung-soo.

References

External links
 

1992 births
Living people
Australian male judoka
Judoka at the 2016 Summer Olympics
Olympic judoka of Australia